Escuintla is one of the 22 departments of Guatemala. The capital of the department is the city of Escuintla. Escuintla covers an area of 4,384 km² and is situated in the coastal lowland region, directly south of Guatemala City, and bordered by the Pacific Ocean. Escuintla produces about 43 percent of gross domestic product of Guatemala.

Municipalities 

 Escuintla
 Guanagazapa
 Iztapa
 La Democracia
 La Gomera
 Masagua
 Nueva Concepción
 Palín
 San José
 San Vicente Pacaya
 Santa Lucía Cotzumalguapa
 Sipacate
 Siquinalá
 Tiquisate

Museums
Museo Regional de Arqueología de la Democracia

Notes

External links
Interactive department map

 
Departments of Guatemala